The 1987 Ms. Olympia contest was an IFBB professional bodybuilding competition was held in 1987 in New York City, New York. It was the 8th Ms. Olympia competition held.

Results

See also
 1987 Mr. Olympia

References

 1987 Ms Olympia Results

External links
 Competitor History of the Ms. Olympia

Ms Olympia, 1987
Ms. Olympia

Ms. Olympia
History of female bodybuilding